These are programs offered from the integrated efforts of both the Saskatchewan Rivers School Division #119 and the Prince Albert Catholic School Division.

Carlton Connections
A program for students with learning disabilities for students 13 years or older.

E.A.G.L.E.  program
An alternative program for students 16 years of age or older who have difficulties with success in traditional school settings.

Junior Lucy Baker program
A school for students who suffer from reluctance, social difficulties and other issues, which stop them from adjusting to a traditional school setting. For students in their junior years, about 14 and 15 years of age.

Power program
This is a program located within Wesmor High School.  It is specially designed to accommodate those students with mental disabilities.

The Star Program
Behaviour modification program located at the P.A.C.I. High School facility.

Storefront
Storefornting is a way for students to get those credits they are needing to graduate without having to sit through classes in the classroom.

Work education
Work education or "Work Ed" is a program for students of high school age who have severe learning disabilities.  They function in a lot of normal classes like the rest of the school, but one thing about this program is they get some work experience skills by doing job like tasks at various places in the city of Prince Albert.  This program is also located within Carlton Comprehensive High School.

See also
Saskatchewan Rivers School Division #119
Prince Albert Catholic School Division

Education in Saskatchewan